Isaac "Pop" Folkoff also known as "Volkov," "Folconoff," and "Uncle" (1881 -1975), was a senior founding member of the California Communist Party and West Coast liaison between  Soviet intelligence  and the Communist Party USA (CPUSA).

Career
In 1904, a 24-year-old Folkoff arrived San Francisco, where he ran an embroidery business.

He helped found the California Communist Party and had gone as a delegate for the founding of the Communist International ("Comintern") in Moscow in 1919.

A former garment presser and self-taught Marxist philosopher, Folkoff specialized in fund-raising for party causes.

He was in charge of West Coast operations. He worked as a courier passing information to and from Soviet sources, and as a talent spotter and vetter of potential espionage recruits. He also worked as a Case Officer. His code name in Soviet intelligence and in the Venona files was "Uncle".

Notes taken in 1939 by Adolph Berle show that Whittaker Chambers told him:  West Coast-Head : "The Old Man"-Volkov is his real name - daughter a Comintern courier. He knows the West Coast underground-Residence: San Francisco or Oakland

When Grigory Markovich Kheifitz, formerly personal secretary to Lenin's wife Nadezhda Krupskaya, came to San Francisco in 1941, he began meeting with Folkoff to develop information and recruit intelligence workers among American Communists.

Venona
According to the National Security Agency, Folkoff appears in several Venona descripts as "Uncle":
 April 18, 1945:  "Uncle told us..."
  May 18, 1945:  "According to information from Uncle..."

Personal
Folkoff married Minni. 1930 census data shows that their niece Minnie Folkoff and nephew Robert Folkoff lived with them at the time. Robert Folkoff was a veteran of World War I.

See also

 Whittaker Chambers 
 Grigory Markovich Kheifitz
 James Walter Miller

References

Sources 
 
John Earl Haynes and Harvey Klehr, Venona: Decoding Soviet Espionage in America (New Haven: Yale University Press, 1999), pgs. 234, 235, 239.

External links
 

American communists
American spies for the Soviet Union
American people in the Venona papers
1881 births
1975 deaths
Emigrants from the Russian Empire to the United States